The Bloomberg Billionaires Index, launched in March 2012, is a daily ranking of the world's 500 richest people based on their net worth. It draws information from "action in the stock market, economic indicators and news reports", features a profile of each billionaire, and includes a tool that allows users to compare the fortunes of multiple billionaires. The index is updated every day at the close of trading in New York.

The index's editorial policy excludes its billionaire founder and majority owner, Michael Bloomberg, from the ranking.

2023 rankings
The rankings are updated only on every trading day after the closing bell of every trading day based on New York's time.

Launch and background 
Bloomberg Billionaires Index is a daily ranking of the world's billionaires published by Bloomberg News since March 2012. It tracks the 500 wealthiest people in the world. The ranking was designed to provide a more transparent and accountable presentation of the world's biggest personal fortunes. At first, the index only tracked the 20 richest people in the world, and then expanded to 100, 200, 400 and later 500 in October 2016.

At its launch in 2012, Mexican telecommunications tycoon Carlos Slim was in the top spot, with an estimated $65.8 billion net worth. Beginning in May 2013, Microsoft co-founder Bill Gates was the world's top billionaire. Amazon CEO Jeff Bezos and Spanish fashion retailer Amancio Ortega both saw a large increase in their respective net worths during 2016 and 2017 and challenged Gates for the number one spot. Bezos eventually surpassed him in 2018 and by 2021 was surpassed furthermore by Elon Musk, who was considered the richest person on Earth until mid-December 2022 when Tesla's share price fell and Bernard Arnault became the wealthiest person in the world.

The Index reports on hidden wealth and has uncovered more than 400 hidden billionaires since its founding. Bloomberg Billionaires founding editor Matthew Miller said in 2013 that hidden billionaires are identified by "making sure that we have accounted for all the companies in closely-held assets around the world." Some of the billionaires the index has uncovered includes JPMorgan Chase chairman Jamie Dimon, In-N-Out Burger president Lynsi Torres, Ferrari Motors heir Piero Ferrari and the chairman of Biel Crystal Manufactory Yeung Kin-Man.

While reporting on hidden billionaires, the index provides coverage of and attempts to put in perspective the wealth of the world's richest people, such as the former Queen Elizabeth II and former US President Donald Trump.

Methodology 
The index offers a dynamic look at the wealth controlled by the world's richest people while trying to offer a new perspective on how the media views and tracks the movement of that wealth. The index "is built to change daily depending on stock fluctuations and economic/company news."

To calculate individuals' wealth, the index relies on a mixture of public and private data, tracking stock prices and publicly disclosed holdings as well as calculated values for private companies using derived or reported information that is valued using live comparisons to public competitors.

The valuations are converted to U.S. dollars at current exchange rates and do not include assumptions about personal debt.

Journalists have noted that the detailed methodology used for the index is more transparent than the "somewhat vaguer" calculation behind other lists. "The Bloomberg listers say their estimates may be more accurate than the competition's because they have better data and reporting (from Bloomberg terminals and its reporting staff)."

Data visualization 
The full index is available online on the Bloomberg Terminal for free. There are tools to compare the fortunes of multiple billionaires, track the billionaires whose assets change the most, and analyze the one-year performance of individual billionaires or billionaires grouped by industry, region or nation.

Each billionaire's profile includes explanations of asset valuations and more details of each fortune.

See also

The World's Billionaires

References

External links

Billionaires Index
Lists of people by wealth